Plans for Tomorrow is a 2010 Spanish drama film directed by Juana Macías (her feature debut). The cast features Carme Elias, Goya Toledo, Ana Labordeta and Aura Garrido.

Plot 
Set in an indeterminate Spanish city, the plot follows four women at a time their lives are facing radical changes.

Cast

Production 
The film was produced by Teoponte PC, Monte Film and Viernes Producciones, with support from Junta de Extremadura. Shooting locations included the city of Cáceres, in Extremadura.

Release 
On 18 April 2010, the film screened at the Málaga Spanish Film Festival (FMCE), where it was met with acclaim. Distributed by A Contracorriente Films, it was theatrically released in Spain on 19 November 2010.

Reception 
Jonathan Holland of Variety deemed the film to be "a quietly engrossing debut for helmer/co-writer Juana Macias that unpacks the crosscut lives of four women in crisis".

Reviewing for El País, Javier Ocaña considered the film to be a "notable debut" for Macías, highlighting as virtues the subtlety of the script, the magnificent performances, and the agile staging.

Both Ocaña and Holland observed a resemblance in several ways to the 2000 film Amores perros (which also stars Goya Toledo).

Fausto Fernández of Fotogramas gave the film 3 out of 5 stars, highlighting the teen contrast offered by Aura Garrido's performance, whereas he cited the presence of egalitarian cliches as a negative point.

Accolades 

|-
| rowspan = "3" align = "center" | 2010 || rowspan = "3" | 13th Málaga Spanish Film Festival || Silver Biznaga for Best Direction || Juana Macías ||  || rowspan = "3" | 
|-
| Silver Biznaga for Best Supporting Actress || Aura Garrido || 
|-
| Silver Biznaga for Best New Screenwriter || Juana Macías, Juan Moreno, Alberto Bermejo || 
|-
| align = "center" rowspan = "3" | 2011 || rowspan = "2" | 25th Goya Awards || Best New Director || Juana Macías ||  || rowspan = "2" | 
|-
| Best New Actress || Aura Garrido || 
|-
| 20th Actors and Actresses Union Awards || Best New Actress || Aura Garrido ||  || 
|}

See also 
 List of Spanish films of 2010

References 

Films shot in the province of Cáceres
2010s Spanish-language films
2010 films
2010 drama films
Spanish drama films
Films set in Spain
2010s Spanish films